The 1983 Cuore Cup was a men's tennis tournament played on indoor Sport Turf carpet courts at the Palazzo dello Sport in Milan, Italy. The event was part of the Super Series tier of the 1983 Volvo Grand Prix circuit. It was the sixth edition of the tournament and was held from 21 March until 27 March 1983. First-seeded Ivan Lendl won the singles title and earned $70,000 first-prize money. Attendance at the tournament was down compared to the levels of the editions in the late 1970s due to the competition of exhibition matches.

Finals

Singles
 Ivan Lendl defeated  Kevin Curren 5–7, 6–3, 7–6(7–4)
 It was Lendl's 2nd singles title of the year and the 34th of his career.

Doubles
 Tomáš Šmíd /  Pavel Složil defeated  Fritz Buehning /  Peter Fleming 6–2, 5–7, 6–4

References

External links
 ITF tournament edition details

Milan
Cuore Cup
Cuore Cup
Milan Indoor